Jawshan Sagheer is an Islamic supplication which has been quoted in prominent books in a wider description than Dua Jawshan Kabir; and is named as a high dignity Dua which is profitable against the calamity and oppressors. It is also mentioned that reciting this supplication is effective to repel the enemy.

Jawshan Sagheer has been mentioned as a high/worthful Dua, and it is reported that: "when Hadi Abbasi intended to kill Musa ibn Jafar, Musa recited it, as a result he dreamed of the Islamic prophet Muhammad that told him: Allah will annihilate your enemy."

In regards to the references of the Dua, it was narrated by Musa ibn Jafar (as the seventh Imam of Shia Islam), and Sayyed Ibn Tawus has quoted it in Muhaj al-Da'awat; it has also been quoted by Kaf'ami in al-Balad al-Amin, Majlisi in Bahar al-Anwar; and by Sheikh Abbas Qomi in Mafatih al-Janan.

Text 
The first part of Jawshan Sagheer is as follows:

See also 
 Dua Ahd
 Mujeer Du'a
 Du'a Nudba
 Du'a al-Faraj
 The supplication of opening
 Supplication of Abu Hamza al-Thumali

References 

Shia prayers
Islamic terminology

External links 
Dua Joshan (Jawshan) Sagheer
A part of Dua Jawshan Sagheer
Dua Jawshan Al-Sagheer